John "Johnnie" Stiegler (born April 25, 1982) is an American former pair skater. With his sister Tiffany, he won the bronze medal at the 1998 Sparkassen Cup on Ice.

The Stieglers began skating together as children. After winning the junior title at the 1997 U.S. Championships, they were awarded pewter medals on the senior national level in 1998 and 1999. They placed fourth at the 1999 World Junior Championships. Irina Rodnina and Alexander Zaitsev coached the pair in El Segundo, California. They represented the Los Angeles Figure Skating Club.

Their older sister Stephanie was also a competitive skater.

Programs 
with Tiffany Stiegler

Competitive highlights
GP: Grand Prix; JGP: Junior Series / Junior Grand Prix)

with Tiffany Stiegler

References

External links 
 
 

1982 births
American male pair skaters
Living people
Sportspeople from Santa Monica, California
20th-century American people
21st-century American people